Chad Hundeby (1970/1971 – June 12, 2021) was an American long-distance swimmer.

As a child, he was a member of the Blue Buoy Swim School based in Southern California.

In 1991, he won a gold medal in the men's 25 kilometres open water swimming event at the 1991 World Aquatics Championships. In 1994, he set the (then) world record for the fastest swim of the English Channel in a time of 7 h 17 mins. The previous record had stood since 1978, when Penny Lee Dean completed the swim in 7 h 40 mins.

Hundeby has been awarded the Open Water Swimmer of the Year award three times by the USA Open Water Swimming Committee (part of the USA Swimming) – in 1991, 1993 and 1994.

He later became a teacher and taught kindergarten in Placentia California at Melrose Elementary. Hundeby died on June 12, 2021, of a heart attack at the age of 50.

References

Year of birth missing
1970s births
2021 deaths
American male swimmers
Male long-distance swimmers
English Channel swimmers
 World Aquatics Championships medalists in open water swimming
20th-century American people
21st-century American people